is a railway station operated by Kobe New Transit in Chūō-ku, Kobe, Japan. It is located on Port Island and is served by the loop portion of the Port Island Line, and trains only run northbound towards Sannomiya.

Ridership

Adjacent stations

References

External links
  

Railway stations in Japan opened in 1981
Railway stations in Kobe